The Eternal Grind is a 1916 silent drama film directed by John B. O'Brien, and starring Mary Pickford. The film is inspired by the Triangle Shirtwaist Factory fire, which took place in 1911.

Plot
Louise (Pickford) is a sewing-machine girl in a sweatshop in New York City. She lives together with her sisters Amy (Loretta Blake) and Jane (Dorothy West) and are all deprived by bad conditions at work and sickness. Louise tries for the three of them to survive and regards herself as the keeper of her sisters.

Meanwhile, she stands up to her bosses and complains about the dreadful circumstances they work in. When Amy is seduced by the son of the shop-owner, Louise butts in and stops the romance. He eventually abandons Amy and becomes seriously injured in a cave-in. Louise has a secret crush on the son herself and tries to rescue him, hoping he will admit he loves her.

Cast
 Mary Pickford - Louise
 Loretta Blake - Amy
 Dorothy West - Jane
 John Bowers - Owen Wharton
 Robert Cain - Ernest Wharton

Reception
The film was received generally negatively, with The New York Times saying, "Obliged by her Famous Players contract to star in pedestrian melodramas like The Eternal Grind, it was no wonder that Mary Pickford yearned to become her own producer".

Preservation status
A print is preserved in Cinematheque Francais.

See also
 List of American films of 1916
 Mary Pickford filmography

References

External links

1916 films
1916 drama films
Silent American drama films
American silent feature films
American black-and-white films
Films set in New York City
Paramount Pictures films
Films directed by John B. O'Brien
1910s American films
1910s English-language films